The New Zealand Film and Television School (The Film School) is a higher education institution centred on the visual arts based in Wellington, New Zealand. It was purchased by Whitireia New Zealand and became Whitirea Screen Production.

Education in Wellington
Film schools in New Zealand